Piada Italian Street Food is a fast casual Italian cuisine restaurant chain with 49 locations in 7 states (Ohio, Indiana, Kentucky, Minnesota, North Carolina, Pennsylvania & Texas). There are 25 locations in Ohio, 2 in Indiana, 1 in Kentucky, 3 in Minnesota, 3 in North Carolina, 5 in Pennsylvania and 10 in Texas.

The restaurant features custom-rolled wraps (Piadas) in a stone-grilled, thin-crusted dough made from organic flour and extra virgin olive oil, as well as chopped salads and pasta bowls. The chain features food prepared along an assembly line, and has been called an Italian copycat of Chipotle Mexican Grill.

Chris Doody, owner of the company, is a co-founder of the Bravo Brio Restaurant Group chain. He sold his stake to investors in 2006 and launched the Piada concept around the Italian "wrap-like sandwich" known as a Piada or Piadina, a street food he sampled in northern Italy. It is stuffed with pastas, meats, cheeses, sauce and vegetables. Piada also serves pasta bowls, chopped salads, power bowls and soups. They also offer cannoli chips—a dessert item and Guest favorite. There is a kids menu featuring smaller versions of the main menu items.

See also
 Piadina
 List of Italian restaurants

References

External links
 Company website

Fast-food chains of the United States
Italian-American culture in Ohio
Restaurants in Ohio
Fast casual restaurants
Companies based in the Columbus, Ohio metropolitan area
2010 establishments in Ohio
American companies established in 2010
Italian restaurants in the United States